The Perthshire Advertiser (originally the Perthshire Advertiser and Strathmore Journal) is a tabloid newspaper, published by Reach plc, in Perth, Scotland. The PA, as it is commonly known, has two editions, a Tuesday and Friday. 

Beginning life in 1829 as the Strathmore Journal, and published in Coupar Angus, the 'Strathmore' was renamed the Perthshire Advertiser and Strathmore Journal. Costing 7d and comprising four densely packed pages, it was issued on Thursday mornings.

The paper's price was reduced to fourpence halfpenny on 8 September 1836 and dropped a further penny in 1855 as a result of the reduction in newspaper stamp duty.

In 1866, Samuel Cowan became the paper's printer and publisher, a role he maintained until 1907. The paper dropped its price to 3d in §870 and in 1873 it began to publish three times a week – on Monday, Wednesday and Friday.

Publication days were changed from Wednesday and Saturday to Tuesday and Friday on March 1, 1977.

Notable publishers 

 1830s: John Taylor
 George Penny
 Charles Anderson
 1866: Samuel Cowan
 1907 Donald Mathieson
 1911? Davidson and Mackay/Munro Press Ltd
 1958: Scottish Counties Newspapers Ltd
 1960: George Outram Ltd
 1972: Scottish and Universal Newspapers Ltd
 1974: Holmes MacDougall Ltd
 1977: Scottish and Universal Newspapers Ltd

Circulation 
By 1832 the PA was already claiming success, suggesting  it had doubled subscription numbers during the previous 12 months, and  its circulation was 'not only the largest of any paper in the country, but equal, if not superior, to that of any provincial journal in the Kingdom". In 1821, annual circulation was 31,000 (average circulation 596). In 1835, this had risen to 26,500 (compared to 14,000 for the Perth Courier and 10,000 for the Perth Constitutional. In 1919, 5,000 copies were printed, but by 1921 the total was 487,000 and by 1924 this had increased to766,317. In 1928, nett annual circulation was 833,032. By 1979, the paper claimed a circulation of each issue of 12,812 (Wednesday) and 19,134 (Friday).

Printing 
Originally printed at the printing office in the Kings' Arms Close, High Street Perth, adjacent to the municipal buildings, Llike all Scottish and Universal/Media Scotland newspapers, the PA used to be printed locally, but in the mid-1990s the printing of all of their Scottish titles was centralised at a new custom-built plant at Blantyre. Editions of its newspapers and guides were transferred to being printed in Merseyside in 2016. The PAs Perth office was formerly housed at 36-38 Tay Street.

See also
 List of newspapers in Scotland

References

External links
 Perthshire Advertisers official website
 The Perthshire Advertiser at media.info

Publications established in 1829
Newspapers published in Scotland
Mass media in Perth and Kinross
Mass media in Perth, Scotland
Companies based in Perth, Scotland
1829 establishments in Scotland
Newspapers published by Reach plc